Richland Township is one of eleven townships in Monroe County, Indiana, United States. As of the 2020 census, its population was 15,098 and it contained 6,455 housing units.

History
Richland Township was established in 1829.

Ennis Archaeological Site, Maple Grove Road Rural Historic District, Matthews Stone Company Historic District, and Leroy Mayfield House are listed on the National Register of Historic Places.

Geography

Cities, towns, villages
 Bloomington (west edge)
 Ellettsville (vast majority)

Unincorporated towns
 Forest Park Heights at 
 West Brook Downs at 
(This list is based on USGS data and may include former settlements.)

Cemeteries
The township contains these three cemeteries: Coffey, Dowell, Richland and Whitehall.

Major highways
 Indiana State Road 46
 Indiana State Road 48

School districts
 Richland-Bean Blossom Community School Corporation

Political districts
 Indiana's 9th congressional district
 State House District 46
 State Senate District 40

References

 https://www.census.gov/search-results.html
 United States Census Bureau 2008 TIGER/Line Shapefiles

External links
 Indiana Township Association
 United Township Association of Indiana
 City-Data.com page for Richland Township

Townships in Monroe County, Indiana
Bloomington metropolitan area, Indiana
Townships in Indiana